The following list includes settlements, geographic features, and political subdivisions of Mississippi whose names are derived from Native American languages.

Listings

State
 Mississippi – from an Algonquian language, probably Ojibwe, meaning "big river" (Ojibwe misiziibi).

Counties

 Amite County – either from French amitié ("friendship"), or Choctaw himmita ("young")
 Attala County
 Chickasaw County
 Choctaw County
 Choctaw, Bolivar County, Mississippi
 Choctaw, Neshoba County, Mississippi
 Coahoma County
 Coahoma
 Copiah County
 Issaquena County
 Issaquena
 Itawamba County
 Neshoba County
 Neshoba
 Noxubee County
 Oktibbeha County
 Panola County
 Pontotoc County
 Pontotoc
 Tallahatchie County
 Tippah County
 Tishomingo County
 Tunica County
 Yalobusha County
 Yazoo County
 Yazoo City
 Little Yazoo

Settlements

Acona – uncertain etymology
Alamucha
Arcola
Arkabutla
Bigbee and Bigbee Valley – shortened from Tombigbee
Biloxi
Bogue Chitto
Bogue Chitto, Lincoln County
Bogue Chitto River and several creeks named Bogue Chitto with headwaters in Hinds, Kemper, Noxubee, and Clarke Counties – from Choctaw bok (creek) and chito (big)
Bolatusha
Buckatunna
Byhalia – uncertain etymology
Bywy
By-Wy Creek
Bywy Creek
Cayuga – named for the Cayuga, an Iroquois nation from New York
Chatawa
Cheraw – named for the Cheraw people of North Carolina
Chiwapa
Chulahoma
Chunky
Cohay
Coila
Conehatta
Coosa
Eastabuchie
Escatawpa
Eucutta
Hiwannee
Homochitto
Hopoca – uncertain etymology
Hushpuckena
Itta Bena
Ituma
Iuka – uncertain etymology
Kewanee – uncertain Choctaw etymology; uncertain relationship to Kewanee, Illinois as an anatopism
Kokomo – named after Kokomo, Indiana, itself of uncertain etymology
Kolola Springs
Looxahoma
Mantachie
Mashulaville
Michigan City – named after Michigan
Mingo – named after the Chickasaw word for chief, not the Mingo tribe
Mississippi City
Muskegon – named after Muskegon, Michigan
Nanachehaw (Allen)
Napanee – uncertain etymology
Natchez
New Houlka
Nitta Yuma
Noxapater
Ocobla
Ofahoma
Okahola
Oklahoma
Okolona
Oktoc
Oswego – named for Oswego, New York
Osyka
Pachuta
Pascagoula
Pelahatchie
Pocahontas – named after a Powhatan individual from Virginia
Poticaw Landing – uncertain etymology
Quofaloma
Sabougla
Sapa – very uncertain etymology
Saratoga – named for Saratoga, New York
Satartia
Scooba
Senatobia
Shoccoe – named for Shocco Creek, North Carolina, itself of Catawba etymology
Shongelo
Shubuta
Shuqualak
Sipsey Fork
Skuna
Sucarnoochee
Suqualena
Tallahala
Tallula
Talowah
Tamola
Tawanta – very uncertain etymology
Tchula
Teoc
Texas – named for Texas, which has Caddoan etymology
Tibbee
Tillatoba
Tippo
Tishomingo
Toccopola
Tocowa
Toomsuba
Topeka – named for Topeka, Kansas
Topisaw
Tougaloo – likely derived from Choctaw for "two creeks" or "second creek" and unrelated to the Cherokee Tugaloo
Tula
Tunica and North Tunica
Tupelo
Tuscola
Wahalak
Wautubbee
Wenasoga – very uncertain etymology
Winona – named Winona, Minnesota, itself named after a Dakota individual
Yokena

Bodies of water

Abiaca Creek
Abotcaputa Creek
Alampa Creek
Alamuchee Creek
Amite River
Apookta Creek
Archusa Creek
Arkabutla Creek and Arkabutla Lake
Lake Atchafalaya (Atchafalaya Bayou, Silver City, Mississippi)
Bagasha Creek
Bahala Creek
Bala Chitto Creek
Balucta Creek
Batupan Bogue
Bayou Costapia
Bayou Talla (Hancock County) and Bayou Talla (Jackson County)
Beasha Creek
Besa Chitto Creek
Bibalucta Creek
Biba Wila Creek
Biloxi River and Biloxi Bay
Bodka Creek
Big Bogue
Big Scooba Creek, Little Scooba Creek, and Flat Scooba Creek
Bogue Cheely
Bogue Culley
Bogue Ealiah Creek, Boguefala Creek, Boque Falia Creek, Bogue Faliah, Bogue Fallah, Bogue Flower (Lauderdale County), Bogue Flower (Clarke County), and Bogue Phalia – from Choctaw bok (creek) and falaa (long)
Bogue Falema Creek
Bogue Hasty
Bogue Homo, Bogue Homo & Bogue Homo Lake, and Bogue Homa – from Choctaw bok (creek) and homma (red)
Bogue Statinea
Boguegaba Creek
Bokshenya Creek
Bolatusha Creek
Bolingchessa Creek
Bollybusha Creek
Bophumpa Creek
Bose Nukse Creek
Boughenia Creek
Buckatunna Creek and Buckatunna Lake
Busfaloba Creek
Butputter Creek – uncertain etymology
Buttahatchee River
Byhalia Creek
Calabrella Creek
Canna Creek
Castaffa Creek
Catahoula Creek
Catalpa Creek
Chautauqua Lake & Lake Chautauqua – named after Chautauqua Lake in New York, which has Iroquoian origin.
Chenokaby Creek, an older name for Scotchenflipper Creek
Chewalla Creek and Chewalla Lake – from Chickasaw chowaala (cedar); Chewawah Creek is possibly a corrupted form of that same etymology
Chicago Branch – named for Chicago, itself derived from a Great Lakes Algonquian language.
Chickasaw Bayou and Chickasaw Hill
Chickasawhay River and Chickasawhay Creek
Chicopa Creek
Chicwillasaw Creek
Chief Chisca Lake
Chilli Creek
Chinchahoma Creek
Chittobochiah Creek and its historic name, Ittobechi Creek.
Chiwapa Creek
Chubby Creek (Itawamba County) and Chubby Creek (Benton County)
Chunky Creek and Chunky River
Chuquatonchee Creek
Coffadeliah Creek
Coffee Bogue
Coila Creek
Comite Creek – very uncertain etymology
Concobona Creek
Conehatta Creek
Conehoma Creek
Coonewah Creek
Coonipper Creek
Coonshuck Creek
Copiah Creek and Copiah Lake
Cuffawa Creek
Cushtusia Creek
Escatawpa River
Etehomo Creek
Euclautubba Creek
Eucutta Creek and Eutacutachee Creek
Fannegusha Creek, Fannegusha Creek, and Old Fannegusha Creek
Funny Creek and Funny Yockana Creek
Hashuqua Creek
Hatchapaloo Creek
Hatchie River – related to the common root word for "river" in Muscogean languages, such as Choctaw hvcha or hacha and Creek hvtce; however, the river is located within traditional Chickasaw homeland of North Mississippi, and the modern Chickasaw word for river is abookoshi’, suggesting that either the name is a more recent appellation or that the Chickasaw language has diverged from Choctaw.
Hickahala Creek
Hobolochitto Creek
Hobuck Creek
Hollicar Creek
Homochitto River
Hontokalo Creek
Hornolucka Creek
Hotopha Creek
Houlka Creek
Hushpuckena River and Hushpuckena Creek
Ichusa Creek
Ishitubba Creek
Jofuska Creek
Kentawka Canal
Kentuctah Creek
Kenty Creek
Kickapoo Lake – named after the Kickapoo people originally of the Illinois Country
Kinterbish Creek
Kittahutty Creek
Lafomby Creek
Lake Itawamba
Lake Mohawk – named for the Mohawk, an Iroquois nation from New York
Lake Monocnoc
Lake Piomingo
Lake Pushmataha
Lake Sequoyah
Lake Tallaha
Lake Tangipahoa
Lake Tiak-O'Khata
Lappatubby Creek
Little Bogue
Loakfoma Creek and Loakfoma Lake
Lobutcha Creek
Lonsilocher Canal
Lucknuck Creek
Lukfapa Creek
Luneluah Creek
Luxapallila Creek
Magowah Creek
Mantachie Creek
Mattubby Creek
Minga Branch (Monroe County), Mingo Branch (Tishomingo County), and Mingo Creek (Clarke County) – named after the Chickasaw minko’ (chief), not the Mingo people
Minnehaha River (Magnolia, Mississippi) – named after the Minnehaha Falls in Minnesota
Mississippi River and Mississippi Sound – from the Ojibwe 'Great River'
Mubby Creek
Nanabe Creek
Nanih Waiya Creek
Natchez Island and Natchez Lake
Neshoba County Lake
Nita Lake
Nonconnah Creek, in Tennessee and slightly within Marshall County, Mississippi
Noxapater Creek
Noxubee River
Nuakfuppa Creek
Nusichiya Creek, an older name for Line Creek
Oaklimeter Creek
Oakohay Creek
Oak Slush Creek, previously Okshash Creek
Ocobla Creek
Okachickima Creek
Okahatta Creek
Okannatie Creek
Okatibbee Creek and Okatibbee Lake
Okatoma Creek
Okatuppa Creek
Okeelala Creek
Okhissa Lake
Oktibbeha County Lake
Oktibee Creek
Oktoc Creek
Okwakee Creek
Otak Creek
Otoucalofa Creek
Pachuta Creek
Palusha Creek Canal
Pascagoula River and Pascagoula Bay
Pawticfaw Creek
Peachahala Creek
Pechahalee Creek
Pee Dee Creek – named after the Pee Dee River in South Carolina
Pelahatchie Creek and Pelahatchie Bay
Pellaphalia Creek
Pelucia Creek and Pelucia Bayou
Penantly Creek
Pinishook Creek
Ponta Creek
Pontotoc Ridge
Potacocowa Creek
Poticaw Bayou
Potlockney Creek
Potterchitto Creek
Pottock Creek
Puchshinnubie Creek
Pushacoona Creek
Pushepatapa Creek
Puskus Creek and Puskus Lake
Quarterliah Creek
Quilby Creek
Sabougla Creek
Sanoosee Creek, historical name of Snoody Creek; also Sanooda Creek
Santee Branch – either from Choctaw santi (snake) or named after the Santee River in South Carolina, which was itself named after the Santee tribe
Scoobachita Creek
Scutchalo Creek and Scutchalo Falls
Senatobia Creek
Seneasha Creek
Sewayiah Creek
Shackaloa Creek
Shaui Koli Creek
Shiola Creek
Shockaloo Creek
Shongelo Creek and Shongelo Lake
Shubuta Creek
Shutispear Creek
Sipsey Creek
Skillikalia Bayou
Skuna River
Socki Creek
Soctahoma Creek
Souenlovie Creek
Sowashee Creek
Sucarnoochee River
Sucatolba Creek
Sugar Bogue
Suqualena Creek
Tallabinnela Creek
Tallabogue Creek (Clarke County), Tallabogue (northern Scott County), and Tallabogue (southern Scott County)
Tallachula Creek
Tallahaga Creek
Tallahala Creek and Tallahalla Creek
Tallahatchie River
Tallahatta Creek and Tallahattah Creek
Tallahoma Creek
Tallashua Creek
Tampa Creek
Tangipahoa River
Tarlechia Creek
Tarlow Creek
Tchoutacabouffa River
Tchula Lake
Tennessee River
Teoc Creek (Kemper County), Teoc Creek (Carroll County), and Teock Creek
Teoctalia Creek
Tesheva Creek
Tibbee Creek, Tibbee Lake, Tibby Creek Attala County, and Tibby Creek
Tibbehoy Creek
Tickfaw River
Tifallili Creek
Tilda Bogue
Tillatoba Creek and Tillatoba Lake
Tippah River
Tippo Bayou
Tishkill Creek
Tishomingo Creek
Tishtony Creek
Toby Tubby Creek
Toccopola Creek
Tokeba Bayou
Tombigbee River
Tonacana Creek
Toomsuba Creek
Topashaw Creek
Topisaw Creek
Tubbalubba Creek
Tubby Creek
Tuckabum Creek
Tumbaloo Creek
Tunica Hills and Tunica Lake
Tuscolameta Creek
Tuscahoma Formation
Tuscumbia River
Tuxachanie Creek
Upper Bogue
Wahalak Creek
Walkiah Bluff
Waukomis Lake
Wautubbee Formation
Wingo Branch
Yalobusha River
Yamacrow Creek
Yanubbee Creek
Yazoo River
Yockanookany River
Yocona River
Yoda Creek
Yonaba Creek
Yonkapin Lake

See also
List of place names in the United States of Native American origin

References

Citations

Sources

 
 Bright, William (2004). Native American Placenames of the United States. Norman: University of Oklahoma Press. .

 
History of Mississippi
Place names
Native American history of Mississippi